Taiwei may refer to:

Grand Commandant, a military commander title in East Asian history
Taiwei, Henan, a town in Wuyang County, Henan, China